Abu Muhammad may refer to:
Abu Muhammad al-Adil, Almohad Caliph of Morocco
Abu Muhammad al-Sufyani, Umayyad nobleman, pretender to the Caliphate
Abu Muhammad al-Yazuri, Fatimid vizier of the Caliphate

Nom de guerre
Abu Mohammad al-Julani,  Syrian militant leader, $10 million bounty
Abu Muhammad al-Shimali, Iraqi-Saudi militant leader, $5 million bounty
Abu Mohammad al-Adnani, Syrian ISIS leader, killed by U.S. airstrike
Abu Muhammad Kadarsky,  Russian ISIS leader, killed by FSB

Nom de plume
Abu Muhammad al-Maqdisi, Jordanian-Palestinian Islamist writer